The Alpheios Project is an open source initiative originally focused on developing software to facilitate reading Latin and ancient Greek. Dictionaries, grammars and inflection tables were combined in a set of web-based tools to provide comprehensive reading support for scholars, students and independent readers. The tools were implemented as browser add-ons so that they could be used on any web site or any page that a user might create in Unicoded HTML.
  
In collaboration with the Perseus Digital Library, the goals of the Alpheios Project were subsequently broadened to combine reading support with language learning. Annotation and editing tools were added to help users contribute to the development of new resources, such as enhanced texts that have been syntactically annotated or aligned with translations.
  
The Alpheios tools are designed modularly to encourage the addition of other languages that have the necessary digital resources, such as morphological analyzers and dictionaries. In addition to Latin and ancient Greek, Alpheios tools have been extended to Arabic and Chinese. 
 
The Alpheios Project is a non-profit (501c3) initiative. The software is open source, and resides on Sourceforge.com. The Alpheios software is released as GPL 3.0 and texts and data as CC-by-SA.

History 

The Alpheios Project was established in 2007 by Mark Nelson, the founder of the commercial software company Ovid Technologies, which he started after writing a search engine for medical literature that became widely popular in medical libraries and research facilities (Strauch, 1996). Nelson, who holds an MA in English literature from Columbia University, sold the company to Wolters Kluwer in 1999 (Quint, 1998). Nelson created Alpheios by recruiting several developers and programmers from his previous company, defining the project's initial goals and funding its first three years of operation. In 2008 he also provided the initial funding for The Perseus Treebank of Ancient Greek, which has subsequently been crowd-sourced.

In 2011, the Perseus Project hired key Alpheios staff and the activities of the projects were extensively integrated, although Alpheios remains an independent organization focused on developing adaptive reading and learning tools that can provide formative assessment customized to the individual user's special abilities and goals, including the study of specific authors or texts.

To date, all Alpheios applications, enhanced texts and code have been provided without any fees or licenses. A separate Alpheios LLC provides commercial consultation on customization and extension of the Alpheios tools.

Currently Available Alpheios Resources

Reading Support Tools (Available as Browser Plugins)

Latin

Dictionaries 
William Whitaker's Words
A Latin Dictionary by Lewis and Short

Grammars 
A New Latin Grammar by Charles Edwin Bennett

Morphological Analyzers 
Whittaker's Words morphological analyzer
Morpheus from the Perseus Project

Inflection tables 
Alpheios- derived from Allen and Greenough's New Latin Grammar

Greek

Dictionaries 
Greek-English Lexicon by Liddell and Scott
Liddell and Scott's Intermediate Greek Lexicon
A Homeric dictionary by Georg Autenrieth
John Jeffrey Dodson's Lexicon of Biblical Greek  (supplied by Jonathan Robie)
Abbott-Smith's Manual Greek Lexicon of the New Testament (supplied by Jonathan Robie)

Grammars 
Greek Grammar by Herbert Weir Smyth

Morphological Analyzers 
Morpheus from the Perseus Project

Inflection tables 
Alpheios- derived from the Ancient Greek Tutorials by Donald Mastronarde and from Smyth

Arabic

Dictionaries 
H.A. Salmone's Advanced Learner's Arabic-English Dictionary
E.W. Lane's Arabic English Lexicon

Morphological analyzer 
Buckwalter

The reading tools also contain some pedagogical features typically found in e-tutors such as morphological and lexical quizzes and games and the automatic comparison of the user's own claims about vocabulary proficiency with his recorded use of the dictionary resources.

Enhanced Texts (originals derived chiefly from the Perseus Project)

Greek

syntactic diagrams (Treebank) 
All of Homer, Hesiod and Aeschylus. Selections from Sophocles and Plato.

eg the Odyssey

alignment with a translation 
Homer, first book of the Odyssey

Latin

syntactic diagrams 
Selections from Ovid

alignment with a translation 
Two poems by Propertius

Arabic 

a number of the Arabic texts that Perseus has digitized are available directly from Alpheios, including:

Kitab al-Aghani: "The Book of Songs"

Kitāb alf laylah wa-laylah: "The Arabian Nights" 

Selections from The Voyages of Ibn Batuta.

Selections from the Annals of Tabari

The Autobiography of the Constantinople Story-teller

Annotation Tools for Text Enhancement and Pedagogy

Treebank editor 
Supports manual diagramming of sentences in any language that has spaces or punctuation between its words, annotating the nodes and arcs as desired, and exporting as a re-usable xml document.

Alignment editor 
Supports manual word or phrase alignment of a text in any language with its translation into any other language, and export as a re-usable xml document.

The New Testament in Greek and Latin (courtesy of the PROIEL Treebank) is provided for practicing use of the alignment editor.

Other Alpheios Projects 

Prototype of a poetry reader with a line from the Iliad read by Stanley Lombardo.
 
Prototype of a text analysis tool to compare the frequency of lemmas in two different texts.

Prototype of a text analysis tool that returns the frequency of both lemmas and specific morphological forms, and the frequency with which a given morphological form represents a specific grammatical function, and vice versa.

Prototype of integration into the Moodle learning management system to generate a dynamic reading list.

Research Collaborations 

the Perseus Digital Library, Tufts University.

Fragmenta Historica 2.0: quotations and text re-use in the semantic web. Monica Berti. University of Rome, Tor Vergata:

Integration into a Collaborative Editing Platform for the Perseids Project: Marie-Claire Beaulieu. Tufts University, funded by the Andrew Mellon Foundation.

Prototype of wordnets for Latin and ancient Greek developed with the Perseus Project and Federico Boschetti and Monica Monachini of the Istituto di Linguistica Computazionale "Antonio Zampolli" in Pisa.

Prototype of a system for automatic alignment of Greek and Arabic as part of A Digital Corpus for Greco-Arabic Studies (A joint project of the Classics Departments of Harvard and Tufts Universities funded by the Andrew Mellon Foundation).

Developing a research platform for comparing Computer Assisted Language Learning methods and collecting "big data" on second language learning with Brian MacWhinney and John Kowalski, Department of Psychology, Carnegie Mellon University.

Chief Pedagogical Collaborators 

University of Leipzig: Humboldt Chair of Digital Humanities: Open Philology: E-Learning Project.

Robert J. Gorman.  Department of Classics and Religious Studies. University of Nebraska-Lincoln

Anise Ferreira. Departamento de Linguística da Faculdade de Ciências e Letras. University of São Paulo: "Júlio de Mesquita Filho". Campus de Araraquara.(FCL-Ar/UNESP).

Neven Jovanović. Department of Classical Philology, University of Zagreb.

Alpheios encourages participation by interested individuals whether or not they have current academic affiliations.

References 
Alpheios Annotation and Alignment Editors in Project Bamboo
ancientworldonline
digital classicist
Almas B. and Berti. M. “The Linked Fragment: TEI and the Encoding of Text Re-uses of Lost Authors”: The Linked TEI: Text Encoding in the Web. TEI Conference and Members Meeting 2013, Università di Roma Sapienza, October 2–5, 2013
Berti M. and Pietruschka. U. “The Laments of the Philosophers at the Tomb of Alexander: an Example of Text Re-Use in Oriental Languages”: 4ème Colloque International Aliento. Énoncés sapientiels brefs, traductions, traducteurs et contextes culturels et historiques du Xe siècle au XVe siècle: les textes transmis à l’Occident, (MSH Lorraine) – Paris (INALCO), 6-8 novembre 2012
Quint, B. http://newsbreaks.infotoday.com/NewsBreaks/Ovid-Technologies-Bought-by-Wolters-Kluwer-for-200-Million-17998.asp
Strauch, K. "Mark Nelson, Founder and President, Ovid Technologies," Against the Grain: Vol. 8: Iss. 4, Article 13.Available at: https://docs.lib.purdue.edu/atg/vol8/iss4/13

External links 
 
 Alpheios code on Sourceforge

Educational projects
Language learning software
Free language learning software
Lifelong learning
Distance education
Language education
Ancient Greek
Latin language